is a Japanese actor and voice actor from Tokyo. He made his acting debut in the 2007 remake of Tsubaki Sanjuro. He is currently known for his portrayal of Daiki Kaito/Kamen Rider Diend in the Kamen Rider Series Kamen Rider Decade and its films.

Filmography

TV dramas

Films

Anime

CD
"Treasure sniper" as Daiki Kaito, 2009

References

External links
Official blog 
Official agency profile 

1990 births
Living people
Aoni Production voice actors
Horikoshi High School alumni
Japanese male musical theatre actors
Japanese male video game actors
Japanese male voice actors
Male voice actors from Tokyo